Tamerlan Elbrusovich Varziyev (born 22 September 1978) is a former Russian professional footballer. He made his debut in the Russian Premier League in 2003 for FC Spartak-Alania Vladikavkaz.

References

1978 births
Sportspeople from Vladikavkaz
Living people
Russian footballers
Association football defenders
FC Spartak Vladikavkaz players
Russian Premier League players
FC Volgar Astrakhan players
FC Neftekhimik Nizhnekamsk players
FC Spartak Nizhny Novgorod players